Horace Eugene Whiteside (June 5, 1891 – June 9, 1956) was an American football player and coach of football and basketball. He served as the head football coach at Earlham College from 1914 to 1916, compiling a record of 6–17–2.

Head coaching record

College football

References

External links
 

1891 births
1956 deaths
Basketball coaches from Tennessee
Chicago Maroons football players
Earlham Quakers football coaches
Earlham Quakers men's basketball coaches
High school football coaches in Iowa
People from Bell Buckle, Tennessee
Cornell University alumni
Cornell University faculty